Bleeders is the second full-length studio album by New Zealand band, the Bleeders.

Track listing

"The Black Widow Creeps" – 3:39
"No Hope Left" – 3:56
"Stay Away" - 2:54
"Inside Your Head" - 2:43
"The Price We Pay" - 3:25
"She Screamed She Loved Me" - 3:39
"Tear It Down" - 2:41
"A Great Escape" - 3:05
"A Final Goodbye" - 3:07
"The Truth" - 3:55
"Snap Back to Reality" - 3:31

Personnel

Angelo Munro - vocals
Hadleigh Donald - guitars, backing vocals
Ian King - guitars, backing vocals
Gareth Stack - bass, backing vocals
George Kladis - drums
Samsam - additional vocals on "A Great Escape"

Bleeders albums
2008 albums